The Panasonic Lumix DMC-GX7 announced in August 2013, is a Micro Four Thirds compact mirrorless interchangeable lens camera. 
It was Panasonic's first Micro Four Thirds camera with a built-in in-body stabilization system (IBIS) and has a built-in EVF (add-on EVFs are no-longer supported). Panasonic uses 2-axis in-body stabilization allowing the use of shutter speeds 1 to 2 stops slower than without stabilization, compared to the 4 to 5 stops of improvement offered by Olympus' 5-axis stabilization.

Features include:
 Magnesium alloy body
 New 16 MP Live MOS, Four Thirds sensor (25% better Signal to Noise performance, 10% better sensitivity, 10% better saturation level )
 Venus Engine
 ISO 200 - 25,600 (ISO 125 in extended mode, max. 3,200 in movie mode)
 Maximum shutter speed 1/8000 sec.
 AF detective range: -4 EV to 18 EV 
 Micro Four Thirds mount
 Full HD video capture, including 1920 x 1080/60p (AVCHD or MP4 formats)
 Full-time AF and tracking AF also available in cinema-like 24p video with a bit rate of maximum 24 Mbit/s
 Built-in live view finder (electronic view finder, EVF), 90-degree tilt-able, 2.764M pixel resolution with 100% Adobe RGB color reproduction  
 Built-in 3", 1040K pixel tilting (45 deg. up, 80 deg. down), touch-screen LCD screen 
 Built-in flash (and hot-shoe)
 Sensor-shift, in-body image stabilization (2-axis)
 5fps using single AF with mechanical shutter / 60fps with electronic shutter up to 12 frames
 Focus Peaking
 22 creative effects, HDR
 Panoramic mode, with filters
 Silent Mode, electronic shutter mode
 Near Field Communication (NFC)
 Wi-Fi connectivity
 Black / Silver versions
 Introduction price: $999 in the US (body only)

Successor 
The Panasonic GX8, which succeeds the Panasonic GX7 camera, has a 20MO sensor, an ISO range of 100-25600 and 49 AF points. The Panasonic GX8 can record 4K videos and 4K time-lapse movies.

References

External links 
 Official Website
 Official Specifications
 Review, ePhotozine.com
 Hands-on review, DPReview
 Hands-on review, Imaging Source
 Hands-on review, Pocket Lint
 Hands-on review, Trusted Reviews
 First Look video preview at What Digital Camera Channel (YouTube)

GX7